YouTubers are people mostly known for their work on the video sharing platform YouTube. The following is a list of YouTubers for whom Wikipedia has articles either under their own name or their YouTube channel name. This list excludes people who, despite having a YouTube presence, are primarily known for their work elsewhere.

YouTube personalities

† Denotes the person is deceased

See also

 List of most-subscribed YouTube channels
 List of Internet phenomena
 Viral video
 YouTube

References

Dynamic lists
YouTubers
Video bloggers
YouTubers